TRACE Expert City (abbreviated TEC) or simply TRACE City in short, is a commercial office complex in Maradana, Sri Lanka. It was formerly the Tripoli Market Square, an 18th century complex of derelict British warehouse buildings.

TEC consists of three renovated buildings. The southernmost building is a dual-gable-roofed structure that houses a shared cafeteria and offices belonging to the London Stock Exchange Group. The main central building consists of thirteen parallel warehouse bays, and houses much of the rentable  TRACE Auditorium, and offices including that of CodeGen. The northernmost building, or "Exchange House", is a single gable-roofed structure that houses further offices belonging to the London Stock Exchhange Group.

TRACE (Technologically Reawaken the Culture of Excellence) was developed with the support of the Urban Development Authority (UDA) and Sri Lanka Association of Software and Service Companies, with the intention of promoting development through innovative technology. It was declared opened on 28 July 2014 by Gotabaya Rajapaksa, along with the Chairman of the UDA, Nimal Perera, dignitaries from the Sri Lankan Army, and the management of CodeGen.

Future
The final phase of converting the former Tripoli Market to a multi-purpose complex involves the development of a combination of four high-rise and mid-rise buildings. In addition to office space, plans include recreational space, further parking, research facilities, a supermarket, and residential and hotel facilities.

See also
 Information Technology in Sri Lanka

References

External links
 
 
 
 
 

Buildings and structures in Colombo
Buildings and structures under construction in Sri Lanka